Nationality words link to articles with information on the nation's poetry or literature (for instance, Irish or France).

Events

1075:
 Compilation of the Goshūi Wakashū, the fourth imperial Japanese poetry anthology, begun

Works published
1077:
 Nam quốc sơn hà  (Mountains and Rivers of the Southern Country), asserting the sovereignty of Vietnam's rulers over its lands

Births
Death years link to the corresponding "[year] in poetry" article. There are conflicting or unreliable sources for the birth years of many people born in this period; where sources conflict, the poet is listed again and the conflict is noted:

1071:
 William IX, Duke of Aquitaine (died 1126), an early Occitan Troubadour

1075:
 Yehuda Halevi (died 1141), Hebrew poet in Al-Andalus

1078:
 Ibn Quzman (died 1160), Spanish writer of classical poetry, especially zéjeles

1079:
 Peter Abelard (died 1142), French, writing in Latin

Deaths
Birth years link to the corresponding "[year] in poetry" article:

1071:
 Ibn Zaydún (born 1003), Arabic poet

1072:
 Ouyang Xiu (born 1007), Chinese statesman, historian, essayist and poet
 Asadi Tusi (born unknown), Persian
 Azraqi  (born unknown), Persian
 Qatran Tabrizi (born 1009), Persian

1077:
 Shao Yong (born 1011), Song Chinese philosopher, cosmologist, poet and historian

1078:
 Michael Psellos (born 1017), Byzantine poet and historian (d. after this date)

See also

 Poetry
 11th century in poetry
 11th century in literature
 List of years in poetry

Other events:
 Other events of the 12th century
 Other events of the 13th century

11th century:
 11th century in poetry
 11th century in literature

Notes

11th-century poetry
Poetry